Sun-hwa or Seon-hwa, also spelled Son-hwa in North Korea, is a Korean feminine given name. Its meaning differs based on the hanja used to write the name. There are 41 hanja with the reading "sun" and 15 hanja with the reading "hwa" on the South Korean government's official list of hanja which may be used in given names.

People referred to mononymously by this name include:
Princess Seonhwa of Silla, Korean princess of the Silla Dynasty

Other people with this name include:
Han Sun-hwa (born 1990), South Korean idol singer, former member of girl group Secret
Kim Seon-hwa (born 1991), South Korean team handball player
Lee Seon-hwa (born 1986), South Korean golfer on the LPGA tour
Oh Seon-hwa (born 1956), South Korean-born Japanese writer and journalist
Seo Sun-hwa (born 1982), South Korean sports shooter
Pong Son-hwa (born 1993), North Korean football defender

Fictional characters with this name include:
Kim Seon-hwa, in 2009 South Korean television series Iris
Sun-Hwa Kwon, in 2004–2010 American television series Lost

See also
List of Korean given names

References

Korean feminine given names